Kamlesh Reddy is a Fiji Indian politician who won the Labasa Indian Communal Constituency for the Labour Party in 2006 general election.

References 

Fiji Labour Party politicians
Indian members of the House of Representatives (Fiji)
Living people
Politicians from Labasa
Year of birth missing (living people)